Keith R. Tribble (born 1955)  has been president and chief executive officer (CEO) of Jackson Health Foundation (JHF) since 2014. JHF is the fundraising arm of Jackson Health System (JHS). The Foundation seeks private philanthropic funds to improve JHS facilities, they provide equipment, technology, and support its priority projects. The Foundation's fundraising efforts allow JHS to provide medical care to patients, regardless of financial need, improve health care delivery, enhance the "hospital experience" for patients, and promote wellness and preventive medicine. Since joining JHF, Tribble and his team have secured over $40m in charitable contributions.

Throughout his 30-year career, Tribble has earned a reputation for excellence,  and a strong commitment to bettering the community. Prior to joining JHF, Tribble was the executive vice president and director of athletics for the University of Central Florida (UCF) where he spearheaded efforts to secure a $15M deal for the construction and operation of both the 45,000 seat Bright House Networks Stadium and the 10,000 seat UCF Arena. He was also instrumental in increasing charitable contributions to the UCF athletic department from $3.75M to a record $7.3M during his tenure. He resigned from his post as UCF's Athletic Director in 2011.

For 13 years, Tribble was CEO of the Orange Bowl, an annual collegiate football game played at Hard Rock Stadium in Miami. During his tenure, Tribble was charged with raising funds to support Orange Bowl programs and initiatives. The Orange Bowl Committee recognized his outstanding work by establishing the Keith Tribble Community Service Excellence Award, which honors a South Florida resident who has made a significant impact in their community.

Early life and education 
Tribble was born in Miami, Florida. He attended Miami Killian High School, where he was an outstanding high school football player for the Killian Cougars.

Tribble accepted an athletic scholarship to attend the University of Florida in Gainesville, Florida, where he lettered at offensive guard for coach Doug Dickey's Florida Gators football team from 1974 to 1976. During his time as a Gator football player, he played on three bowl teams. Tribble graduated with a Bachelor of Arts degree in journalism in 1977 and was inducted into the University of Florida Athletic Hall of Fame as a "Distinguished Letter Winner" in 2011. Tribble graduated with a Bachelor of Arts degree in journalism in 1977, and was inducted into the University of Florida Athletic Hall of Fame as a "Distinguished Letterwinner" in 2011.

Athletic administrator
Tribble was an associate athletic director at the University of Florida from 1992 to 1993.  He became the chief executive officer of the Orange Bowl Committee in 1993, and held that position for thirteen years, including the negotiation of the Bowl Alliance and Bowl Championship Series (BCS) agreements.

In June 2006, he was hired as the athletic director of the UCF Knights. At the time he was hired by the University of Central Florida, Tribble was one of nine African-American athletic directors among the 120 major college athletic programs in the Division I/Football Bowl Subdivision (FBS) of the National Collegiate Athletics Association (NCAA). He was also the executive vice president of the University of Central Florida Athletics Association, the private non-profit corporation that is responsible for the administration and financial management of the UCF Knights athletic programs. As UCF's director of athletics, Tribble oversaw $150 million in improvements to the Knights' athletics facilities, with another $70 million in construction approved and pending.

Personal
Tribble is married and has two children.

See also

 UCF Knights
 Florida Gators
 Florida Gators football, 1970–79
 List of University of Florida alumni
 List of University of Florida Athletic Hall of Fame members

References

Bibliography
 Carlson, Norm, University of Florida Football Vault: The History of the Florida Gators, Whitman Publishing, LLC, Atlanta, Georgia (2007).  .
 Golenbock, Peter, Go Gators!  An Oral History of Florida's Pursuit of Gridiron Glory, Legends Publishing, LLC, St. Petersburg, Florida (2002).  .
 Hairston, Jack, Tales from the Gator Swamp: A Collection of the Greatest Gator Stories Ever Told, Sports Publishing, LLC, Champaign, Illinois (2002).  .
 Nash, Noel, ed., The Gainesville Sun Presents The Greatest Moments in Florida Gators Football, Sports Publishing, Inc., Champaign, Illinois (1998).  .

1955 births
Living people
American football offensive guards
Florida Gators football players
UCF Knights athletic directors
College football bowl executives
Sportspeople from Miami
Players of American football from Miami